Kensington is an at-grade train station in unincorporated DeKalb County, Georgia, serving the Blue Line of the Metropolitan Atlanta Rapid Transit Authority (MARTA) rail system. It has one island platform with 1 track on each side. This station opened on June 26, 1993.

Kensington is mainly a park-and-ride train station for commuters heading into Atlanta. This station serves unincorporated communities such as Stone Mountain, Tucker, and Lithonia, as well as the cities of Decatur, Stonecrest and Clarkston.

Bus service at this station to: Dekalb County Sheriffs Headquarters and Jail, Georgia Piedmont Technical College , Georgia State University Clarkston, Georgia Department of Labor, Goldsmith Park & Ride, North Dekalb Mall, Northlake Mall, Toco Hills Shopping Plaza, The Mountain Industrial Business District, GRTA Panola Park & Ride, Clarkston, The Mall at Stonecrest and The City of Stone Mountain . Transfers to the Emory Cliff Shuttle's Oxford route are also available.

Bus Rapid Transit is provided at this station to points along Memorial Drive: 221- Memorial Drive Limited.

Station layout

Buses at this station
The station is served by the following MARTA bus routes:
 Route 8 - North Druid Hills Road / Brookhaven
 Route 21 - Memorial Drive
 Route 86 - Fairington Road / Snapfinger Road / Mall at Stonecrest
 Route 115 - Covington Highway / Mall at Stonecrest
 Route 119 - Hairston Road / Stone Mountain Village
 Route 121 - Memorial Drive / North Hairston Road.

References
http://www.itsmarta.com/august-5th-service-change.aspx

External links 

MARTA Station Page
nycsubway.org Atlanta page
 Station from Google Maps Street View

Blue Line (MARTA)
Metropolitan Atlanta Rapid Transit Authority stations
Railway stations in DeKalb County, Georgia
Railway stations in the United States opened in 1993
1993 establishments in Georgia (U.S. state)